

The Lagos State Ministry of Works and Infrastructure was established in 1967, shortly after the state was established. 
Due to its strategic importance, it is regarded as the State's engine of growth and development.

The Ministry's nomenclature was re-engineered by the Asiwaju Bola Ahmed Tinubu administration when it was renamed Ministry of Works and Infrastructure with effect from 30 April 2003, due to the dynamic nature of its duties and responsibilities.

 Office of Works
 Lagos State Public Works Corporation
 Rehabilitate bad roads within Lagos
 Office of Infrastructure

At the coming on board of the Akinwunmi Ambode administration in 2015, the ministry was taken back to its former status as Ministry of Works and Infrastructure. 
The restructure of the State Ministry of Works and Infrastructure by re-establishing the Office of Works and Office of Infrastructure was approved by Lagos State Governor Mr Babajide Sanwo-Olu in 2021. The volume of work ahead of the current administration in the state, led by Babajide Sanwo-Olu, demanded the restructuring of the ministry, as did the necessity to execute necessary structural reviews that would help the government achieve its policy objectives more quickly.

The executive governor, Babajide sanwo-Olu has made it known to the general public that Lagos state will raise capital through Nigerian Exchange Limited(NGX) to fund infrastructure projects.

PARASTALS 
.Works Corporation (PWC)
Lagos State Public Works Corporation (PWC)
 Lagos State Materials Testing Laboratory
 Lagos State Infrastructure Asset Management Agency
 Lagos State Infrastructure Maintenance and Regulatory Agency (LASIMRA).

The Lagos State Ministry of Works and Infrastructure is the state government ministry, charged with the responsibility to plan, devise and implement the state policies on Works and Infrastructural developments.

See also
Lagos State Ministry of Environment
Lagos State Executive Council

References

Government ministries of Lagos State